Curotek is an American company based in Portland, Oregon that provides technology for community-based care settings such as assisted living communities and group home settings serving those with Dementia, Alzheimer's, Mental Retardation and Developmental Disabilities and other disabilities that cause safety risks associated with freedom of movement and personal autonomy. Curotek provides various hardware devices providing real-time tracking of residents and care staff, an alert system tied to various sensor devices such as bed pads and thresholds and an electronic door control system that locks and unlocks doors based on the proximity of tracking badges. They are also a provider of an electronic documentation suite purposed for assisted living facilities.

History 
Curotek was founded in October 2008 by previous employees of Elite Care Technologies when that company closed its doors. All assets and contracts with customers were transferred to Curotek Corporation. Curotek's technology was initially developed in 2000 for Elite Care at Oatfield Estates, an assisted living facility in Portland, Oregon. Curotek now has its product in facilities all over the United States and is the sole provider of technology for assisted living facilities funded by the Oregon Department of Human Services. Curotek (as Elite Care Technologies at Oatfield Estates) has received national publicity since 2001 from various major print and TV news agencies.

Real-time locating system 
The tracking technology that Curotek uses to provide tracking of care staff and residents is a Real-time locating system (RTLS) system from Ekahau. Tracking is accomplished with badges and Wi-Fi triangulation.

See also
 List of companies based in Oregon

References 

Companies based in Portland, Oregon
Medical technology companies of the United States
Privately held companies based in Oregon
Health care companies established in 2008
Healthcare in Portland, Oregon
2008 establishments in Oregon